Theodore William "Ted" Waitt (born January 18, 1963) is an American billionaire businessman and philanthropist. Waitt is a co-founder of Gateway, Inc.

Career
On September 5, 1985, Waitt, his brother Norm Jr., and Mike Hammond started Gateway 2000 with a $10,000 loan secured by Waitt's grandmother. The company began on Waitt's father's cattle ranch in Sioux City, Iowa, moved to Sergeant Bluff, Iowa and later to North Sioux City, South Dakota, where they continued to develop their "down-home" branding, complete with computer boxes printed in a black and white Holstein cow pattern.

Waitt led a move of the company's headquarters from South Dakota to Poway, California in 1998. Waitt relinquished his post as CEO of Gateway in late 1999 to Jeffrey Weitzen, but returned to the post in January 2001.

In 2004, after the acquisition of eMachines, Waitt turned over day-to-day operations of Gateway and the title of CEO to Wayne Inouye, the former CEO of eMachines.  In May 2005, he resigned as chairman of the company, ending a near 20-year run with the company he co-founded.

Waitt has been featured on numerous lists by Forbes magazine. He has held a spot on both the Forbes 400 Richest in America as well as Forbes list of the World's Billionaires. He has also been listed on Fortune Magazines "40 Richest Under 40", a list of the 40 wealthiest self-made Americans under the age of 40 in the United States.  The 2008 Forbes 400 List listed Waitt with a net worth estimated at $1.4 billion. Waitt fell off the Forbes 400 list in 2009 with a net worth estimate of $900 million. Forbes speculated that the drop from the previous year was as a result of "souring real estate" and a divorce settlement.

According to the September 2002 issue of Fortune Magazine, Waitt sold $1.1 billion in Gateway stock during the dot-com era. In August 2007, Gateway was acquired by Acer Inc. for $1.90 per share or $710 million.

Labeled a maverick by national business and technology publications, he has gone on to form four enterprises that are his chief interests: Avalon Capital Group, Inc., a wholly owned, billion-dollar private investment company with diverse interests in technology, health care, energy, finance, and real estate; and the Waitt Foundation, Waitt Institute and Waitt Institute for Violence Prevention, nonprofit organizations dedicated to the improvement of mankind's knowledge through historical and scientific exploration.

Waitt served as chairman of the Salk Institute for Biological Studies Board of Trustees from November 28, 2016, until November 20, 2017. He originally joined the Salk Board of Trustees in 2004 and has served in numerous roles while donating millions of dollars to the institute.

Personal life
Waitt is married to former model Michele Merkin. He and his first wife Joan Theresa Peschel have four children, Hailey Peschel, Emily Rose, Maxwell Griffin, and Sophia Marie. The two have since divorced.  Waitt's eldest daughter, Hailey, is married to former soccer player Jordan Gafa.

Waitt was romantically linked to Ghislaine Maxwell, after she ended her relationship with Jeffrey Epstein. Waitt owns homes in the Bird Streets area of Hollywood Hills West, Los Angeles (put up for sale for $20 million in September 2015) and in La Jolla, California (purchased in 2005 for $13.32 million and put for sale for $22.9 million in November 2015). Waitt also owns a home in Beverly Hills, California.

Awards and honors
Waitt was awarded an honorary doctorate by the University of South Dakota.

Philanthropy 
Business Week named Waitt one of America's 50 most generous philanthropists due to his work with the Waitt Foundation. The Foundation funds partnerships and projects, sometimes in conjunction or collaboration with the Waitt Institutes, focused on marine conservation.

Established in 1993, the Foundation initially focused on domestic violence prevention and community development. The Waitt Institute is a founding member, along with National Geographic Pristine Seas, Oceans 5, and Dynamic Planet, of the Blue Prosperity Coalition which aims to support governments in sustainable oceans management by providing financing, expertise, and tools to create marine protected areas (MPA).

On November 1, 2019, the Blue Prosperity Coalition announced a ten-year, $150 million commitment from the Waitt Foundation towards its ocean conservation efforts. On 15 Sept, 2016, the Waitt Foundation joined with the Wildlife Conservation Society (WSC), the blue moon fund (bmf), and the Global Environmental Facility (GEF) to commit a combined $48 million towards expansion of the world's marine protected areas (MPA). On 1 May 2008, the Salk Institute for Biological Studies announced the grant of $20 million from the Waitt Foundation to fund the creation of an Advanced Biophotonics Center. On 18 December 2008, the William J. Clinton Foundation released a list of all contributors. It included Theodore Waitt, who gave between US$10–25 million. On April 23, 2011, the Sioux City Public Museum had its grand opening.  $4 million of its $13 million development budget was donated by the Waitt Foundation.

References

1963 births
Living people
American billionaires
American computer businesspeople
American investors
American philanthropists
Businesspeople from San Diego
Gateway, Inc.
People from Sioux City, Iowa
University of Iowa alumni
American technology company founders
People from Union County, South Dakota
People from Poway, California